PROGRES (Programme of Research on the Service Economy) is a research programme set up by the Geneva Association, also known as the International Association for the Study of Insurance Economics. It focuses on questions related to regulation, supervision and international co-operation of insurance and financial services as well as other legal issues of importance. The research programme manages The Geneva Association's co-operation with the supervisory authorities around the world and in particular with the International Association of Insurance Supervisors. The objectives of PROGRES are:

 to identify and analyse the current and future developments of the service economy;
 to gain a better understanding of the role of services and especially financial services as an important contributing factor to the efficient organisation of the modern economy; and
 to investigate the consequences of changes in services for insurance and the impact of developments in insurance on the service economy

PROGRES organises annual international seminars with a special focus on global financial services. These seminars have operated successfully since 1983 to provide an annual forum and focal point for up to 60 specialist inter-disciplinary participants - private-sector practitioners and experts from representative organisations, academics, officials from governments and intergovernmental organisations - to discuss and debate in an informal way issues raised by the moves at the GATT/GATS to liberalise international trade in services. More recently, PROGRES has worked to raise awareness of the extent and success of co-operation between financial services regulators at the global level.

Selected Key Issues

 What are the regulatory necessities in a more globalised world? What are the cost-benefit structures?
 Accounting and solvency issues: What are the approaches to solvency regulation? What are the systemic risks in the insurance sector?
 In the present search for well-managed financial services activity and regulation, many international institutions are more and more evaluating not only the banking world but also insurance: How can we assure that this process does not create harmful, bureaucratic rules but on the contrary helps to enhance the ability and the better understanding of insurance?
 How far will large insurance companies strive to be present in every single market in the world and how?
 What about modern insurance balance sheet management? Is it realistic to expect a major and increasing source of income for insurance in providing services for a fee?
 Bancassurance: A distribution strategy first? An asset management necessity? The future of holdings? Economies of scale versus complexity issues.
 What will the next round of reorganisation in financial services bring? Consolidation versus concentration/focus.
 E-commerce, m-commerce, e-insurance, and m-insurance: Really the new (r)evolution?

Publications

 PROGRES, Geneva Association Information Newsletter, The Geneva Association
 Etudes et Dossiers, Working Paper Series, The Geneva Association
 The Geneva Risk and Insurance Review, formerly The Geneva Papers on Risk and Insurance Theory (until March 2005), The Geneva Association & Springer
 Law and Economics, International Liability Regimes, The Geneva Papers on Risk and Insurance - Issues and Practice, Vol.31 - No.2 / April 2006, Palgrave Macmillan
 Insurance Law and Economics, Regulation and Financial Stability, The Geneva Papers on Risk and Insurance - Issues and Practice, Vol.29 - No.2 / April 2004, Palgrave Macmillan
 Economic Issues in Insurance, Social Issues in Insurance, Insurance Worldwide, The Geneva Papers on Risk and Insurance - Issues and Practice, Vol.26 - No.3 / July 2001, Palgrave Macmillan
 Issues in Law and Economics, Financial Services and Insurance, The Geneva Papers on Risk and Insurance - Issues and Practice, Vol.25 - No.2 / April 2000, Palgrave Macmillan
 Issues in Law and Economics, The Geneva Papers on Risk and Insurance - Issues and Practice, No.87 / April 1998
 The Law and Economics of Insurance, The Geneva Papers on Risk and Insurance - Issues and Practice, No.78 / January 1996
 World Insurance, Economics Issues, The Geneva Papers on Risk and Insurance - Issues and Practice, No.75 / April 1995
 The Law and Economics of Insurance and of Services, The Geneva Papers on Risk and Insurance - Issues and Practice, No.70 / January 1994
 The Economics of Insurance, The Geneva Papers on Risk and Insurance - Issues and Practice, No.66 / January 1993
 Essays in Insurance Economics, The Geneva Papers on Risk and Insurance - Issues and Practice, No.50 / January 1989
 Essays in Insurance Economics, The Geneva Papers on Risk and Insurance - Issues and Practice, No.47 / April 1988
 Essays in Insurance Economics, The Geneva Papers on Risk and Insurance - Issues and Practice, No.42 / January 1987

External links
 The Geneva Association website (known as the International Association for the Study of Insurance Economics) 
 The IAIS website, the International Association of Insurance Supervisors

References

Economic research institutes
Insurance industry organizations